Walter Iselin (born 21 September 1953) is a retired Swiss football midfielder and later manager.

References

1953 births
Living people
Swiss men's footballers
FC Zürich players
FC Gossau players
FC Chiasso players
FC Aarau players
FC Baden players
Association football midfielders
Swiss Super League players
Swiss football managers
FC Zürich managers
FC Wil managers
FC Schaffhausen managers
Footballers from Zürich